Collection: The Shrapnel Years is a compilation album by guitarist Vinnie Moore, released on March 14, 2006 through Shrapnel Records.

Track listing

Personnel

Vinnie Moore – guitar, mixing, production
Wayne Findlay – guitar (tracks 11–12), keyboard (tracks 11, 12)
Tony MacAlpine – keyboard (tracks 1–6)
David Rosenthal – keyboard (tracks 7–10)
Tommy Aldridge – drums (tracks 1–4)
Shane Gaalaas – drums (tracks 5, 6, 11, 12), percussion (tracks 5, 6, 11, 12)
Steve Smith – drums (tracks 7–10)
Andy West – bass (tracks 1–4)
Dave LaRue – bass (tracks 5–10)
Barry Sparks – bass (tracks 11, 12)
Steve Fontano – engineering, production
Dino Alden – engineering
Mark Rennick – engineering
Noah Landis – engineering
James Murphy – engineering
Gustavo Venegas – engineering
Robert M. Biles – engineering
Mat Diamond – engineering
Phil Edwards – engineering
Paul Orofino – mixing, mastering
R.B. Hunter – mixing
George Horn – mastering
Christopher Ash – mastering
Tim Gennert – remastering
Mike Varney – production, executive production

References

External links
In Review: Vinnie Moore "Collection: The Shrapnel Years" at Guitar Nine Records

Vinnie Moore albums
2006 greatest hits albums
Shrapnel Records albums
Albums produced by Mike Varney